Chekhovskaya is a station of the Serpukhovsko-Timiryazevskaya Line of the Moscow Metro. It was opened on December 31, 1987, and served as the northern terminus of the line for the following year. The vestibule is located in Pushkinskaya Square, while the station is named for the writer Anton Chekhov. It was the deepest station in Moscow Metro from 1987 until 1991.

Transfers
The station provides transfers to the Tverskaya station of the Zamoskvoretskaya Line, and the Pushkinskaya station of the Tagansko-Krasnopresnenskaya Line.

Gallery

External links
Chekhovskaya on metro.ru

Moscow Metro stations
Railway stations in Russia opened in 1987
Serpukhovsko-Timiryazevskaya Line
Railway stations located underground in Russia